Ivanjski Bok is a village in central Croatia, in the municipality of Sunja, Sisak-Moslavina County.  It is located in the Banija region, in the fertile plains on the right bank of the Sava river, to the east of the town of Sunja and some 20 km north-west of village of Jasenovac.

History
The village of Ivanjski Bok was established in the late 17th century by the Orthodox Serb settlers from Podkozarje area in Bosnia. The village became a part of the Military Frontier which, at the time, was expanding onto former Ottoman territories such as Lika, Kordun, Banija and lower Slavonia.

During the World War II, the village was a part of the Nazi-puppet state, the Independent State of Croatia, in the municipality of Crkveni Bok, which comprised the villages of Crkveni Bok, Strmen and Ivanjski Bok. Already in early autumn of 1941, the villages' population was subjected to conversion to the Roman Catholic faith.

The three villages, often referred to as the "Banija Triangle", suffered heavy demographic losses with nearly 30% of its population perishing in the World War II.

Culture

Demographics
According to the 2011 census, the village of Ivanjski Bok has 35 inhabitants. This represents 23.81% of its pre-war population.

According to the 1991 census, 91.16% of the village population were ethnic Serbs (134/147).

Notable natives and residents

References 

Populated places in Sisak-Moslavina County
Serb communities in Croatia